South Africa competed at the 2011 World Championships in Athletics from August 27 to September 4 in Daegu, South Korea.

Team selection

Athletics South Africa announced the final team of 26 athletes to represent the country
in the event, including the established names such as Khotso Mokoena, LJ van Zyl, Caster Semenya and Mbulaeni Mulaudzi.

The final team on the entry list comprises the names of 33 athletes.

The following athletes appeared on the preliminary Entry List, but not on the Official Start List of the specific event, resulting in a total number of 32 competitors:

Medalists
The following competitors from South Africa won medals at the Championships

Results

Men

Decathlon

Women

References

External links
Official local organising committee website
Official IAAF competition website

Nations at the 2011 World Championships in Athletics
World Championships in Athletics
South Africa at the World Championships in Athletics